The Battle of Cape Cherchell was a naval battle between the Nationalist heavy cruiser  and the Spanish Republican Navy light cruisers  and  in the Spanish Civil War, several miles north of the Algerian city of Cherchell. In the early morning hours of 7 September 1937, Baleares unexpectedly met a Republican convoy consisting of two merchant ships escorted by Republican cruisers and destroyers. Baleares was beaten off and badly damaged in the engagement, but the merchantmen were lost when they tried to slip away along the Algerine shoreline.

The biggest danger for the convoy was not Baleares itself, but Nationalist shore-based aircraft that might have appeared when the Nationalist cruiser had radioed the convoy's location. Because of this, the four destroyers quickly broke off the engagement and continued to escort the merchant convoy.

While these ships steamed ahead, Republican cruisers Libertad and Méndez Núñez engaged Baleares. A crashing volley from Libertad smashed Baleares''' electronics, temporarily disabling the cruiser's main guns. But the Nationalists repaired the damage and Baleares renewed her pursuit.

The warships met again in the afternoon, Libertad scoring two more hits on critical areas of Baleares. Baleares then limped off to wait for her sister ship . The retreating Republican ships were later attacked, ineffectively, by several Nationalist warplanes, most of them Italian bombers from the Aviación Legionaria'', a squadron of the Regia Aeronautica which fought in Spain under Franco's orders.

During the engagement the captains of the two freighters escorted by the Republican fleet had panicked and changed course to the south to seek shelter in Algerine waters. One of the steamers ran aground in Cherchell, while the remaining ship eventually reached Bona, where she was interned by French authorities.

The Republican fleet commander Miguel Buiza was demoted after this battle.

See also 

 List of classes of Spanish Nationalist ships of the Spanish Civil War
 Aviazione Legionaria
 Spanish Civil War Republican ship classes

Notes

References

External links
Combate Naval Del Cabo Cherchel 

1937 in Spain
Cape Cherchell
Maritime incidents in 1937
Cape Cherchell
Cape Cherchell
September 1937 events